Basin Street West was a nightclub owned by Jack Yanoff in San Francisco located in the North Beach neighborhood at on 401 Broadway. It opened as a Jazz club in 1964, then integrated soul and rock acts before its closure in 1973.

History 
Jack Yanoof opened the Basin Street West as a jazz club in 1964. The first performers were Latin jazz pianist Eddie Cano and pianist Hampton Hawes. Comedians also performed at the club. The only surviving video footage of Lenny Bruce performing in a nightclub was recorded at Basin Street West in August 1965. 

By 1967, Yanoof was booking rock acts like Jefferson Airplane. Soul acts such as Otis Redding and Smokey Robinson & The Miracles also performed at the club. R&B duo Ike & Tina Turner recorded a live album there in 1969.

After Basin Street West closed in 1973, it was replaced by a Korean restaurant.

Notable performers 
 The Miles Davis Quintet
 Dizzy Gillespie
 Jefferson Airplane
 The Ike & Tina Turner
 Otis Redding
 Little Richard
 Smokey Robinson & The Miracles
 Rudy Ray Moore
 Martha Reeves & The Vandellas
Ray Charles
The Fifth Dimension
Four Tops
Sam & Dave
Buddy Rich
 El Chicano
 Joe Simon
 Lenny Bruce
 Sly Stone
 Mongo Santamaria
 Armando Peraza
 Kenny Rogers and the First Edition

Live albums 

 1964: Essential O'Day – Anita O'Day
 1966: Woody's Winners – Woody Herman
 1967: Woody Live: East and West – Woody Herman and His Swingin' Herd
 1967: Dancing In the Street – Ramsey Lewis
 1969: In Person – Ike & Tina Turner & The Ikettes
 1971: Tears of Joy – Don Ellis
 1971: For All We Know – Charlie Byrd

See also
Basin Street East

References

External links 

 Basin Street West San Francisco Concert Setlists

Defunct nightclubs in California
Former music venues in California
Music venues in San Francisco
Nightclubs in San Francisco
North Beach, San Francisco
1960s in California
History of San Francisco
1964 establishments in California
1973 disestablishments in California